Grace Sylvia Ingrid Annemarie Tanamal  (born January 10, 1957 in The Hague) is a Dutch politician. As a member of the Labour Party (Partij van de Arbeid) she was an MP between November 8, 2012 and March 23, 2017. She was a member of the municipal council of Amersfoort between 2002 and 2012.

References 

1957 births
Living people
Dutch people of Indonesian descent
Dutch people of Moluccan descent
Labour Party (Netherlands) politicians
Members of the House of Representatives (Netherlands)
Municipal councillors of Amersfoort
Politicians from The Hague
21st-century Dutch politicians
21st-century Dutch women politicians